Brognon may refer to the following places in France:

Brognon, Ardennes, a commune in the department of Ardennes
Brognon, Côte-d'Or, a commune in the department of Côte-d'Or